The Surinamese Interior War was a civil war waged in the Sipaliwini District of Suriname between 1986 and 1992. It was fought by the Tucayana Amazonas led by Thomas Sabajo and the Jungle Commando led by Ronnie Brunswijk, whose members originated from the Maroon ethnic group, against the National Army led by then-army chief and de facto head of state Dési Bouterse.

Background 

Suriname has one of the most ethnically diverse populations in South America, with people of ethnic Indian (South Asian), Javanese, Chinese, European, Amerindian, African (Creole and Maroon), and multiracial origin. The Maroons' ancestors were African slaves who escaped from coastal Suriname between the mid-seventeenth and late eighteenth centuries to form independent settlements in the interior. They settled in interior parts of Suriname, and gained independence by signing a peace treaty with the Dutch in the 1760s. The Dutch were unable to conquer them and agreed to allow them autonomy within their territory.

In 1975 Suriname gained full independence from the Netherlands. Dési Bouterse participated in building a national army. Five years later, in 1980, he and fifteen other army sergeants led a bloody coup against the country's Government. Bouterse eventually consolidated all power. In 1987 he directed the National Assembly to adopt a new constitution that allowed him to continue as head of the army, as a civilian government was established under close watch.

Conflict 

The war began as a personal feud between Bouterse and Brunswijk, a Maroon who had served as Bouterse's bodyguard. It later assumed political dimensions. Brunswijk demanded democratic reforms, civil rights, and economic development for the country's Maroon minority.

The Surinamese Interior War started in Stolkertsijver on 22 July 1986 at around 03:00. 12 soldiers guarding the checkpoint were captured. Later that night, an armed group opened fire on the army barracks in Albina. The fighting lasted three hours, and one soldier and two civilians were wounded. Later it was confirmed that the Jungle Commando headed by Ronnie Brunswijk was behind both attacks. The National Army responded by destroying the temple in Moengotapoe, and capturing all males present. 

In November 1986, military forces attacked Moiwana, home village of Brunswijk. They massacred 35 people, mostly women and children. They destroyed most of the village, burning down Brunswijk's house and others. More than 100 survivors fled across the border to French Guiana.

On 1 June 1989 rebels captured Afobaka Dam, Suriname's main hydroelectric plant, and threatened to flood the capital Paramaribo unless the government agreed to negotiations. Despite the threats, the rebels withdrew 36 hours later on Brunswijk's orders. On 7 June 1989 talks were held on the island of Portal. The delegations reached an agreement on a tentative peace proposal. The government signed the pact on 21 July 1989, which was approved by parliament on 7 August 1989. The accord declared the intention of both sides to end hostilities.

A cease-fire was signed in June 1989. An emergency aid program to rebuild Maroon villages, an end to a state of emergency in the eastern part of the country, and the return of refugees to Suriname were among the actions launched by the peace agreement. The government had proposed that the Jungle Commando troops were to be transformed into a security unit, to patrol the interior of the country.

A group of indigenous people felt betrayed by the 1989 Treaty of Kourou, which gave the Maroons more rights, but neglected indigenous rights. On 31 August 1989, they took possession of the ferry near Jenny and called themselves the Tucayana Amazonas. The group went on to take possession of the villages of Apoera, Washabo, and finally Bigi Poika where they set up their headquarters. The Tucayana Amazonas were headed by Thomas Sabajo and his brother Hugo "Piko". In-fighting occurred and Thomas switched sides to the Surinamese Army which quickly moved in to regain control over the area. Piko fled to Guyana, but was arrested by the police in February 1990, and returned to Suriname where Piko and his supporters were killed.

Cease-fire violations continued after the truce without escalating into a full-scale conflict.
But by September 1989, at least 300 people had been killed, numerous villages were destroyed, and bauxite mining operations were being disrupted. An estimated 7000 maroons fled to refugee camps in French Guiana.

On 19 March 1991, a meeting between representatives took place in the eastern mining town of Moengo. The government offered integration of Jungle Commando into the Suriname Army, and jobs for Maroons in gold prospecting and forestry in return for complete disarmament. On 27 March 1991, final talks were held in the town of Drietabbetje, effectively putting an end to the conflict. Despite the agreement, a number of Jungle Commando officials residing in the Netherlands denounced the conditions and vowed to continue their armed struggle.

On 8 August 1992, a peace treaty was signed between the National Army, the Jungle Commando, and the Tucayana Amazonas.

War crimes 
On 7 and 8 December 1982, military policemen kidnapped 15 men from their beds, most of them civilians, placed them on a bus and then murdered them after conspiracy charges were lodged against them (see the December murders). The victims were all members of the Suriname Association for Democracy, a group critical of the Surinamese military government. The group, according to government officials, was part of a conspiracy that was planning a coup d'état on Christmas Day. The state later admitted of conducting inadequate investigations into the case. An investigation began in 2008. Despite accepting political responsibility, Bouterse denied direct involvement.

On 29 November 1986, the military government executed more than 40 people, including women and children, and burned the village of Moiwana. Three years after the attack, a statement was issued, in which Bouterse assumed direct responsibility for the murders. As a result of an Inter-American Commission on Human Rights (IACHR) investigation, the Surinamese government made a public apology to the victims' families in 2006, additionally paying compensation to the survivors. The perpetrators of the crime remained unpunished.

On 23 April 1987, the war had come to Sipaliwini. The Jungle Commando headed by Ronnie Brunswijk ordered the villagers of Pokigron into the jungle, robbed them of their possessions, and burned their houses. On 11 September 1987, the National Army led by Dési Bouterse, retaliated by attacking the Jungle Commando, and according to a report by Aide Médicale Internationale, killed civilians including women and children. Both parties have denied that any civilians had been killed. On 27 September 1989, the Inter-American Commission on Human Rights looked into the matter, declared that this constituted a very serious violation of the Right to Life, recommended that the Government of Suriname investigate the matter, and that the relatives of the victims are entitled to fair compensation. The IACHR identified 15 cases of deaths, four disappearances and one was unclear. Six of the cases were children, and three were women of which one was raped before she was killed.

On 31 December 1987, during a counter-insurgency operation in the Atjoni region seven Maroon civilians were driven off in a military vehicle on suspicion of belonging to the Jungle Commando. A few kilometers further, they were ordered to dig their own graves. Six of the Maroons were summarily executed while the seventh died from sustained injuries while trying to escape. An IACHR investigation into the case was launched in January 1988.
On 10 September 1993 the court awarded the victims' families U.S.$450,000 in damages and required Suriname to compensate the families for the expenses incurred in locating the victims' bodies. A second decision further determined the financial reparations insufficient, ordering the state to re-open the Saramaca medical dispensary and the school in the victims' village.

References

Sources
 Vries, E. de: Suriname na de binnenlandse oorlog, Amsterdam 2005: KIT Publishers, 
 Hoogbergen, W. & D. Kruĳt: De oorlog van de sergeanten: Surinaamse militairen in de politiek, Amsterdam 2005: Bakker,

External links
 VPRO Wereldnet, dinsdag 6 september 2005
 Oneworld: Binnenlandse oorlog
 Rapport van de Mensenrechtencommissie van Midden-Amerikaanse staten betreffende een incident te Atjoni nabij Pokigron

Civil wars involving the states and peoples of South America
Conflicts in 1986
Conflicts in 1987
Conflicts in 1988
Conflicts in 1989
Conflicts in 1990
Conflicts in 1991
Conflicts in 1992
History of Suriname
Guerrilla wars
Surinamese Maroons
Wars involving Suriname
1980s in Suriname
1990s in Suriname
1986 in Suriname
1987 in Suriname
1988 in Suriname
1989 in Suriname
1990 in Suriname
1991 in Suriname
1992 in Suriname